Joakim Jaša Bakov (9 December 1906 – 21 October 1974) was a Serbian athlete. He competed in the men's pole vault at the 1936 Summer Olympics, representing Yugoslavia.

References

External links
 

1906 births
1974 deaths
Athletes (track and field) at the 1936 Summer Olympics
Serbian male pole vaulters
Olympic athletes of Yugoslavia
Place of birth missing